Zip & Zap and the Marble Gang is a 2013 Spanish adventure film directed by Oskar Santos. It is based on the comic book series Zipi y Zape, created by José Escobar Saliente

The film had its premiere at the 2013 Toronto International Film Festival on September 8, 2013. It was well received at Festival de San Sebastián on 21 September 2013. The film had a theatrical release in Spain on October 4, 2013. The film later screened at 2014 Sundance Film Festival, in newly introduced category Sundance Kids on January 18, 2014.

A sequel, Zip & Zap and the Captain's Island, was released in 2016.

Plot
Twin brothers Zip and Zap are sent to the summer school Hope, a re-education centre ran by strict Falconetti, who forbids all forms of recreation and entertainment. When Zap gets in trouble for disrupting a class, he is locked in the "Isolation Room" where he is told to think about what he has done. However, he finds a bag of marbles hidden in the room, and forms the "Marble gang" with several other students in the school, who are Filo, Micro, and Matilda, who is Falconetti's niece, and do various pranks, such as vandalising the statue of Sebastian Hope, the school's founder, and they always leave a single marble at their prank.

When Falconetti attempts to take down the vandalism, he accidentally breaks the part of the statue, revealing a map leading a path to hidden diamonds under the school. Zip and Zap steal the map from his office and follow the map's clues while they are pursued by Falconetti. The Marble Gang end up in a room full of toys, and Zap considers that the "diamonds" in the map were really just a reference to Sebastian Hope's diamonds - his toys. Falconetti finds them, then reveals that the school was originally a school of play and toys ran by Hope, until Falconetti bought over the school and transformed it to please his father. Falconetti locks them in the room of toys, but Micro notices a machine where they insert several toys they picked up while exploring the school. Music starts playing around the school and the students and teachers discover it is coming from the statue of Hope. The underground room Zip and Zap were locked in starts spiralling up into the main garden in front of the school, where all the students and teachers are gathered. The other students start cheering on the Marble Gang, and another teacher punches Falconetti and tells the other teachers to lock Falconetti until the police arrives. The movie ends with Zap recollecting how "we never found the diamonds, but it was the best summer we ever had," and the 5 members of the Marble Gang all holding their last marble together, than tossing it into the air. The diamonds are revealed to have been hidden in the marble.

Cast

Reception
Zip & Zap and the Marble Gang received positive reviews from critics. Jonathan Holland in his review for The Hollywood Reporter said that "A slice of wholesome, family-friendly entertainment whose main interest lies in its lavish often spectacular visuals." Jaime Winston  of Salt Lake magazine, praised the film by saying that "The dialogue's witty, the special effects are seamless and the story is pretty smart." Matthew Blevins in his review for Next Projection said that "Zip & Zap and the Marble Gang will entrance kids and speak to their intrinsic rebelliousness with its charms and message to never underestimate the value of fun, even if reactionary parents and cruel taskmasters have forgotten the best parts of youth."

Accolades

References

External links
 
 

2013 films
2010s children's adventure films
Spanish adventure films
Spanish children's films
Films based on Spanish comics
Live-action films based on comics
Zeta Studios films
MOD Producciones films
Kowalski Films films
Atresmedia Cine films